This is My Drug Hell is the first studio album by British rock group My Drug Hell. Music critic Dan Phelan gave the album the lowest grading, criticising the band’s attitude for using old equipment for the sake of it and the album’s lack of melodies, with the explicitly mentioned exception of Girl at the Bus Stop.

Track listing

Personnel 

 Tim Briffa – Vocals, Guitar
 Paul Donnelly – Bass guitar
 Joe Bultitude – Drums

References

1996 albums